Sorkheban-e Sofla (also Romanized as Sorkhebān-e Soflá) is a village in Sharvineh Rural District, Kalashi District, Javanrud County, Kermanshah Province, Iran. At the 2006 census, its population was 268, in 55 families.

References 

Populated places in Javanrud County